Abdul Hakim is a Muslim male given name, and in modern usage, first name or surname. It is built from the Arabic words Abd, al- and Hakim. The name means "servant of the All-wise", Al-Hakīm being one of the names of God in the Qur'an, which give rise to the Muslim theophoric names.

The letter a of the al- is unstressed, and can be transliterated by almost any vowel, often by e. So the first part can appear as Abdel, Abdul or Abd-al. The second part may appear as Hakim, Hakeem, or in other ways. The whole name is subject to variable spacing and hyphenation.

Notable persons with the name Abdul Hakim or variants include:

Abdul Hakim Sialkoti (1561–1656), Punjabi Muslim scholar
Abdul Hakim (poet) (1620–1690), Bengali poet
Abdul Hakim Sarkar, Bangladeshi professor and academician
Abdul Hakeem (speaker), Speaker of the East Bengal Legislative Assembly.
Abdulhakim Arvasi (1865–1943), Turkish Islamic scholar
Abdel Hakim Amer (1919–1967), Egyptian soldier and politician
Abdel Hakim Qasem (1934–1990), Egyptian novelist
Abdul Hakim Bukhary (born 1955), Saudi held in Guantanamo
 Abdal Hakim Murad, name used by Timothy Winter (born 1960), British Muslim scholar 
Abdelhakim Serrar (born 1961), Algerian footballer
Abdul Hakim Murad (militant) (born 1968), Pakistani alleged terrorist
Abdelhakim Bagy (born 1968), Moroccan-French runner
 Maulavi Abdul Hakim Munib (born ca. 1971), Afghan politician
Adel Abdulhehim (born 1974), Uighur-Chinese held in Guantanamo
Abdul Hakim al-Mousa (born 1976), Saudi held in Guantanmo
Abdihakem Abdirahman (born 1977), Somali-American long-distance runner
Abdelhakim Elouaari (born 1980), French footballer
Abdelhakim Laref (born 1985), Algerian-Belgian footballer
Abdelhakim Omrani (born 1991), French footballer
Abdul Hakeem Khan, Pakistani politician
Abdul Hakim Jan (Argandab tribal leader) (died 2008), Afghan
Abdel Hakim Tizegha, Algerian alleged terrorist
Abdel Hakim Shelmani, Libyan football referee
Abdelhakim Belhadj (born 1966), Libyan anti-Gaddafi military leader

References

See also 
 Abd al-Hakam

Arabic masculine given names